Agnoshydrus is a genus of beetles in the family Dytiscidae, containing the following eight species:

 Agnoshydrus barong (Hendrich, Balke & Wewalka, 1995)
 Agnoshydrus ciampori Wewalka & Wang, 2007
 Agnoshydrus confusus Wewalka & Biström, 1997
 Agnoshydrus densus Biström, Nilsson & Wewalka, 1997
 Agnoshydrus laccophiloides (Régimbart, 1888)
 Agnoshydrus paulbrowni Wewalka & Wang, 2007 
 Agnoshydrus schillhammeri Wewalka, 1999
 Agnoshydrus taiwanus Wewalka & Wang, 2007

References

External links

Dytiscidae